(), also known just as Nikon, is a Japanese multinational corporation headquartered in Tokyo, Japan, specializing in optics and imaging products. The companies held by Nikon form the Nikon Group. 

Nikon's products include cameras, camera lenses, binoculars, microscopes, ophthalmic lenses, measurement instruments, rifle scopes, spotting scopes, and the steppers used in the photolithography steps of semiconductor fabrication, of which it is the world's second largest manufacturer. The company is the eighth-largest chip equipment maker as reported in 2017. Also, it has diversified into new areas like 3D printing and regenerative medicine to compensate for the shrinking digital camera market.

Among Nikon's many notable product lines are Nikkor imaging lenses (for F-mount cameras, large format photography, photographic enlargers, and other applications), the Nikon F-series of 35 mm film SLR cameras, the Nikon D-series of digital SLR cameras, the Nikon Z-series of digital mirrorless cameras, the Coolpix series of compact digital cameras, and the Nikonos series of underwater film cameras. Nikon's main competitors in camera and lens manufacturing include Canon, Sony, Fujifilm, Panasonic, Pentax, and Olympus.

Founded on July 25, 1917 as Nippon Kōgaku Kōgyō Kabushikigaisha ( "Japan Optical Industries Co., Ltd."), the company was renamed to Nikon Corporation, after its cameras, in 1988. Nikon is a member of the Mitsubishi group of companies (keiretsu).

History
Nikon Corporation was established on 25 July 1917 when three leading optical manufacturers merged to form a comprehensive, fully integrated optical company known as Nippon Kōgaku Tōkyō K.K. Over the next sixty years, this growing company became a manufacturer of optical lenses (including those for the first Canon cameras) and equipment used in cameras, binoculars, microscopes and inspection equipment. During World War II the company operated thirty factories with 2,000 employees, manufacturing binoculars, lenses, bomb sights, and periscopes for the Japanese military.

Reception outside Japan
After the war Nippon Kōgaku reverted to producing its civilian product range in a single factory. In 1948, the first Nikon-branded camera was released, the Nikon I. Nikon lenses were popularised by the American photojournalist David Douglas Duncan. Duncan was working in Tokyo when the Korean War began. Duncan had met a young Japanese photographer, Jun Miki, who introduced Duncan to Nikon lenses. From July 1950 to January 1951, Duncan covered the Korean War. Fitting Nikon optics (especially the NIKKOR-P.C 1:2 f=8,5 cm) to his Leica rangefinder cameras produced high contrast negatives with very sharp resolution at the centre field.

Names and brands

Founded in 1917 as Nippon Kōgaku Kōgyō Kabushikigaisha ( "Japan Optical Industries Corporation"), the company was renamed Nikon Corporation, after its cameras, in 1988. The name Nikon, which dates from 1946, was originally intended only for its small-camera line, spelled as "Nikkon", with an addition of the "n" to the "Nikko" brand name. The similarity to the Carl Zeiss AG brand "ikon", would cause some early problems in Germany as Zeiss complained that Nikon violated its trademarked camera. From 1963 to 1968 the Nikon F in particular was therefore labeled 'Nikkor'.

The Nikkor brand was introduced in 1932, a westernised rendering of an earlier version Nikkō, an abbreviation of the company's original full name (Nikkō also means "sunlight" and is the name of a famous Japanese onsen town.). Nikkor is the Nikon brand name for its lenses.

Another early brand used on microscopes was Joico, an abbreviation of "Japan Optical Industries Co". Expeed is the brand Nikon uses for its image processors since 2007.

Rise of the Nikon F series

The Nikon SP and other 1950s and 1960s rangefinder cameras competed directly with models from Leica and Zeiss. However, the company quickly ceased developing its rangefinder line to focus its efforts on the Nikon F single-lens reflex line of cameras, which was successful upon its introduction in 1959. For nearly 30 years, Nikon's F-series SLRs were the most widely used small-format cameras among professional photographers, as well as by some U.S. space program, the first in 1971 on Apollo 15 (as lighter and smaller alternative to the Hasselblad, used in the Mercury, Gemini and Apollo programs, 12 of which are still on the Moon) and later once in 1973 on the Skylab and later again on it in 1981.

Nikon popularized many features in professional SLR photography, such as the modular camera system with interchangeable lenses, viewfinders, motor drives, and data backs; integrated light metering and lens indexing; electronic strobe flashguns instead of expendable flashbulbs; electronic shutter control; evaluative multi-zone "matrix" metering; and built-in motorized film advance. However, as auto focus SLRs became available from Minolta and others in the mid-1980s, Nikon's line of manual-focus cameras began to seem out of date.

Despite introducing one of the first autofocus models, the slow and bulky F3AF, the company's determination to maintain lens compatibility with its F-mount prevented rapid advances in autofocus technology. Canon introduced a new type of lens-camera interface with its entirely electronic Canon EOS cameras and Canon EF lens mount in 1987. The much faster lens performance permitted by Canon's electronic focusing and aperture control prompted many professional photographers (especially in sports and news) to switch to the Canon system through the 1990s.

Post-millenium film camera production 
Once Nikon introduced affordable consumer-level DSLRs such as the Nikon D70 in the mid-2000s, sales of its consumer and professional film cameras fell rapidly, following the general trend in the industry. In January 2006, Nikon announced it would stop making most of its film camera models and all of its large format lenses, and focus on digital models.

Nevertheless, Nikon remained the only major camera manufacturer still making film SLR cameras for a long time. The high-end Nikon F6 and the entry-level FM10 remained in production all the way up until October 2020.

Digital photography

Digital single-lens reflex and point and shoot cameras 

Nikon created some of the first digital SLRs (DSLRs, Nikon NASA F4) for NASA, used in the Space Shuttle since 1991. After a 1990s partnership with Kodak to produce digital SLR cameras based on existing Nikon film bodies, Nikon released the Nikon D1 SLR under its own name in 1999. Although it used an APS-C-size light sensor only 2/3 the size of a 35 mm film frame (later called a "DX sensor"), the D1 was among the first digital cameras to have sufficient image quality and a low enough price for some professionals (particularly photojournalists and sports photographers) to use it as a replacement for a film SLR. The company also has a Coolpix line which grew as consumer digital photography became increasingly prevalent through the early 2000s. Nikon also never made any phones.

Through the mid-2000s, Nikon's line of professional and enthusiast DSLRs and lenses including their back compatible AF-S lens line remained in second place behind Canon in SLR camera sales, and Canon had several years' lead in producing professional DSLRs with light sensors as large as traditional 35 mm film frames. All Nikon DSLRs from 1999 to 2007, by contrast, used the smaller DX size sensor.

Then, 2005 management changes at Nikon led to new camera designs such as the full-frame Nikon D3 in late 2007, the Nikon D700 a few months later, and mid-range SLRs. Nikon regained much of its reputation among professional and amateur enthusiast photographers as a leading innovator in the field, especially because of the speed, ergonomics, and low-light performance of its latest models. The mid-range Nikon D90, introduced in 2008, was also the first SLR camera to record video. Since then video mode has been introduced to many more of the Nikon and non-Nikon DSLR cameras including the Nikon D3S, Nikon D3100, Nikon D3200, Nikon D5100, and Nikon D7000. 

More recently, Nikon has released a photograph and video editing suite called ViewNX to browse, edit, merge and share images and videos. Despite the market growth of Mirrorless Interchangeable Lens Cameras, Nikon did not neglect their F-mount Single Lens Reflex cameras and have released some professional DSLRs like the D780, or the D6 in 2020.

Mirrorless interchangeable-lens cameras 
In reaction to the growing market for Mirrorless cameras, Nikon released their first Mirrorless Interchangeable Lens Cameras and also a new lens mount in 2011. The lens mount was called Nikon 1, and the first bodies in it were the Nikon 1 J1 and the V1. The system was built around a 1 inch (or CX) format image sensor, with a 2.7x crop factor. This format was pretty small compared to their competitors. This resulted in a loss of image quality, dynamic range and fewer possibilities for restricting depth of field depth of field range. In 2018, Nikon officially discontinued the 1 series, after three years without a new camera body. (The last one was the Nikon 1 J5).

Also in 2018, Nikon introduced a new mirrorless system in their lineup: the Nikon Z system. The first cameras in the series were the Z 6 and the Z 7, both with a Full Frame (FX) sensor format, In-Body Image Stabilization and a built-in electronic viewfinder. The Z-mount is not only for FX cameras though, as in 2019 Nikon introduced the Z 50 with a DX format sensor, without IBIS but with the compatibility to every Z-mount lens. The handling, the ergonomics and the button layout are similar to the Nikon DSLR cameras, which is friendly for those who are switching from them. This shows that Nikon is putting their focus more on their MILC line.

In 2020 Nikon updated both the Z 6 and the Z 7. The updated models are called the Z 6 II and the Z 7 II. The improvements over the original models include the new EXPEED 6 processor, an added card slot, improved video and AF features, higher burst rates, battery grip support and USB-C power delivery.

In 2021, Nikon released 2 mirrorless cameras, the Z fc and the Z 9. The Nikon Z fc is the second Z-series APS-C (DX) mirrorless camera in the line up, designed to evoke the company's famous FM2 SLR from the '80s. It offers manual controls, including dedicated dials for shutter speed, exposure compensation and ISO. The Z 9 became Nikon's new flagship product succeeding the D6, marking the start of a new era of Nikon cameras. It includes a 46 megapixel Full Frame (FX) format stacked CMOS sensor which is stabilized and has a very fast readout speed, making the mechanical shutter not only unneeded, but also absent from the camera. Along with the sensor, the 3.7 million dot, 760 nit EVF, the 30 fps continuous burst at full resolution with a buffer of 1000+ compressed raw photos, 4K 120 fps ProRes internal recording, the 8K 30 fps internal recording and the 120 hz subject recognition AF system make it one of the most advanced cameras on the market with its main rivals being the Canon EOS R3 and the Sony α1. (As of February 2022)

Movie camera production
Although few models were introduced, Nikon made movie cameras as well. The R10 and R8 SUPER ZOOM Super 8 models (introduced in 1973) were the top of the line and last attempt for the amateur movie field. The cameras had a special gate and claw system to improve image steadiness and overcome a major drawback of Super 8 cartridge design. The R10 model has a high speed 10X macro zoom lens.

Contrary to other brands, Nikon never attempted to offer projectors or their accessories.

Thai operations
Nikon has shifted much of its manufacturing facilities to Thailand, with some production (especially of Coolpix cameras and some low-end lenses) in Indonesia. The company constructed a factory in Ayuthaya north of Bangkok in Thailand in 1991. By 2000, it had 2,000 employees. Steady growth over the next few years and an increase of floor space from the original 19,400 square meters (209,000 square feet) to 46,200 square meters (497,000 square feet) enabled the factory to produce a wider range of Nikon products. By 2004, it had more than 8,000 workers.

The range of the products produced at Nikon Thailand include plastic molding, optical parts, painting, printing, metal processing, plating, spherical lens process, aspherical lens process, prism process, electrical and electronic mounting process, silent wave motor and autofocus unit production.

As of 2009, all of Nikon's Nikon DX format DSLR cameras and the D600, a prosumer FX camera, are produced in Thailand, while their professional and semi-professional Nikon FX format (full frame) cameras (D700, D3, D3S, D3X, D4, D800 and the retro-styled Df) are built in Japan, in the city of Sendai. The Thai facility also produces most of Nikon's digital "DX" zoom lenses, as well as numerous other lenses in the Nikkor line.

Nikon-Essilor Co. Ltd.
In 1999, Nikon and Essilor have signed a Memorandum of understanding to form a global strategic alliance in corrective lenses by forming a 50/50 joint venture in Japan to be called Nikon-Essilor Co. Ltd.

The main purpose of the joint venture is to further strengthen the corrective lens business of both companies.
This will be achieved through the integrated strengths of Nikon's strong brand backed up by advanced optical technology and strong sales network in Japanese market, coupled with the high productivity and worldwide marketing and sales network of Essilor, the world leader in this industry.

Nikon-Essilor Co. Ltd. started its business in January 2000, responsible for research, development, production and sales mainly for ophthalmic optics.

Recent development
Revenue from Nikon's camera business has dropped 30% in three years prior to fiscal 2015. In 2013, it forecast the first drop in sales from interchangeable lens cameras since Nikon's first digital SLR in 1999. The company's net profit has fallen from a peak of 75.4 billion (fiscal 2007) to 18.2 billion for fiscal 2015. Nikon plans to reassign over 1,500 employees resulting in job cuts of 1,000, mainly in semiconductor lithography and camera business, by 2017 as the company shifts focus to medical and industrial devices business for growth.

Film cameras
In January 2006 Nikon announced the discontinuation of all but two models of its film cameras, focusing its efforts on the digital camera market. It continues to sell the fully manual FM10, and still offers the high-end fully automatic F6. Nikon has also committed to service all the film cameras for a period of ten years after production ceases.

Film 35 mm SLR cameras with manual focus
 High-end (Professional – Intended for professional use, heavy duty and weather resistance) 
 Nikon F series (1959, known in Germany for legal reasons as the Nikkor F)
 Nikon F2 series (1971)
 Nikon F3 series (1980)

 Midrange 
 Nikkorex series (1960)
 Nikkormat F series (1965, known in Japan as the Nikomat F series)
 Nikon FM (1977)
 Nikon FM2 series (1982)
 Nikon FM10 (1995)

 Midrange with electronic features 
 Nikkormat EL series (1972, known in Japan as the Nikomat EL series)
 Nikon EL2 (1977)
 Nikon FE (1978)
 Nikon FE2 (1983)
 Nikon FA (1983)
 Nikon F-601M (1990, known in North America as the N6000)
 Nikon FE10 (1996)
 Nikon FM3A (2001)

 Entry-level (Consumer) 
 Nikon EM (1979)
 Nikon FG (1982)
 Nikon FG-20 (1984)
 Nikon F-301 (1985, known in North America as the N2000)

Film APS SLR cameras
 Nikon Pronea 600i / Pronea 6i (1996)
 Nikon Pronea S (1997)

Film 35 mm SLR cameras with autofocus

High-end (Professional – Intended for professional use, heavy duty and weather resistance)
 Nikon F3AF (1983, modified F3 body with Autofocus Finder DX-1)
 Nikon F4 (1988) – (World's first professional auto-focus SLR camera and world's first professional SLR camera with a built-in motor drive)
 Nikonos RS (1992) (Professional when reviewed in underwater conditions) – (World's first underwater auto-focus SLR camera)
 Nikon F5 (1996)
 Nikon F6 (2004)

High-end (Prosumer – Intended for pro-consumers who want the main mechanic/electronic features of the professional line but don't need the same heavy duty/weather resistance)
 Nikon F-501 (1986, known in North America as the N2020)
 Nikon F-801 (1988, known in the U.S. as the N8008)
 Nikon F-801S (1991, known in the U.S. as the N8008S)
 Nikon F90 (1992, known in the U.S. as the N90)
 Nikon F90X (1994, known in the U.S. as the N90S)
 Nikon F80 (2000, known in the U.S. as the N80)
 Nikon F100 (1999)

Mid-range (Consumer)
 Nikon F-601 (1990, known in the U.S. as the N6006)
 Nikon F70 (1994, known in the U.S. as the N70)
 Nikon F75 (2003, known in the U.S. as the N75)

Entry-level (Consumer)
 Nikon F-401 (1987, known in the U.S. as the N4004)
 Nikon F-401S (1989, known in the U.S. as the N4004S)
 Nikon F-401X (1991, known in the U.S. as the N5005)
 Nikon F50 (1994, known in the U.S. as the N50)
 Nikon F60 (1999, known in the U.S. as the N60)
 Nikon F65 (2000, known in the U.S. as the N65)
 Nikon F55 (2002, known in the U.S. as the N55)

Professional Rangefinder cameras
 Nikon I (1948)
 Nikon M (1949)
 Nikon S (1951)
 Nikon S2 (1954)
 Nikon SP (1957)
 Nikon S3 (1958)
 Nikon S4 (1959) (entry-level)
 Nikon S3M (1960)
 Nikon S3 2000 (2000)
 Nikon SP Limited Edition (2005)

Compact cameras
Between 1983 and the early 2000s a broad range of compact cameras were made by Nikon. Nikon first started by naming the cameras with a series name (like the L35/L135-series, the RF/RD-series, the W35-series, the EF or the AW-series). In later production cycles, the cameras were double branded with a series-name on the one and a sales name on the other hand. Sales names were for example Zoom-Touch for cameras with a wide zoom range, Lite-Touch for ultra compact models, Fun-Touch for easy to use cameras and Sport-Touch for splash water resistance. After the late 1990s, Nikon dropped the series names and continued only with the sales name. Nikon's APS-cameras were all named Nuvis.

The cameras came in all price ranges from entry-level fixed-lens-cameras to the top model Nikon 35Ti and 28Ti with titanium body and 3D-Matrix-Metering.

Movie cameras
 Double 8 (8mm)
 NIKKOREX 8 (1960)
 NIKKOREX 8F (1963)
 Super 8
 Nikon Super Zoom 8 (1966)
 Nikon 8X Super Zoom (1967)
 Nikon R8 Super Zoom (1973)
 Nikon R10 Super Zoom (1973)

Professional Underwater cameras

 Nikonos I Calypso (1963, originally known in France as the Calypso/Nikkor)
 Nikonos II (1968)
 Nikonos III (1975)
 Nikonos IV-A (1980)
 Nikonos V (1984)
 Nikonos RS (1992) (World's first underwater Auto-Focus SLR camera)

Digital cameras

Nikon's raw image format is NEF, for Nikon Electronic File. The "DSCN" prefix for image files stands for "Digital Still Camera – Nikon."

Digital compact cameras

The Nikon Coolpix series are digital compact cameras produced in many variants: Superzoom, bridge, travel-zoom, miniature compact and waterproof/rugged cameras. The top compact cameras are several "Performance" series indicated by a "P...".

Larger sensor compact cameras
Coolpix series since 2008 listed.
Nikon Coolpix P6000, 2008-08-07 (CCD, 14 megapixels, 4x zoom)
Nikon Coolpix P7000, 2010-09-08 (CCD, 10.1 megapixels, 7x zoom)
Nikon Coolpix P7100, 2011-08-24 (roughly same specifications as predecessor)
Nikon Coolpix P7700
Nikon Coolpix A, 2013-03-05 (16MP DX-CMOS sensor)
Nikon Coolpix A900
Nikon Coolpix P7800

Light-weight fast lens compact cameras
Nikon Coolpix P300
Nikon Coolpix P310
Nikon Coolpix P330
Nikon Coolpix P340

Bridge cameras
Nikon Coolpix L810, Feb, 2012–16 MP, 26x optical zoom, no wi-fi, fixed LCD, ISO 80–1600
Nikon Coolpix L820, Jan, 2013–16 MP, 30x optical zoom, no wi-fi, fixed LCD, ISO 125-3200
Nikon Coolpix L830, Jan, 2014–16 MP, 34x optical zoom with 68x Dynamic Fine Zoom, no wi-fi, tilting LCD, ISO 125-1600 (3200 in Auto)
Nikon Coolpix L840 Feb, 2015–16 MP, 38x optical zoom with 76x Dynamic Fine Zoom, built-in Wi-Fi and NFC (Near Field Communication), 3 inch high-resolution tilting LCD, ISO 125   – 1600
ISO 3200, 6400 (available when using Auto mode)
Nikon Coolpix P500, Feb, 2011–12.1 MP, 36x optical zoom, tilt LCD, ISO 160–3200
Nikon Coolpix P510, Feb, 2012–16.1 MP, 41.7x optical zoom (24–1000mm), no wi-fi, vari-angle LCD, ISO 100–3200
Nikon Coolpix P520, Jan, 2013–18.1 MP, 42x optical zoom, optional wi-fi, vari-angle LCD, ISO 80–3200
Nikon Coolpix P530, Feb, 2014–16.1 MP, 42x optical zoom & 84x Dynamic Fine Zoom, opt wi-fi, fixed LCD, ISO 100–1600 (ISO 3200, 6400 in PASM mode)
Nikon Coolpix P600, Feb, 2014–16.1 MP, 60x optical zoom and 120 Dynamic Fine Zoom, built in wi-fi, vari-angle LCD, ISO 100–1600 (ISO 3200, 6400 in PASM mode)

Nikon Coolpix P610
Nikon Coolpix B500, Feb, 2016-16 MP, 40x optical zoom, tilt LCD, ISO 160–6400
Nikon Coolpix P900
Nikon Coolpix P950
Nikon Coolpix P1000

Mirrorless interchangeable-lens cameras

Nikon Z series – Nikon Z-mount lenses
Nikon Z 7, FX/Full Frame sensor, August 23, 2018
Nikon Z 6, FX/Full Frame sensor, August 23, 2018
Nikon Z 50, DX/APS-C sensor, October 10, 2019
Nikon Z 5, FX/Full Frame sensor, July 21, 2020
Nikon Z 6II, FX/Full Frame sensor, October 14, 2020
Nikon Z 7II, FX/Full Frame sensor, October 14, 2020
Nikon Z fc, DX/APS-C sensor, July 2021
Nikon Z 9, FX/Full Frame sensor, October 28, 2021

Nikon 1 series – CX sensor, Nikon 1 mount lenses
Nikon 1 J1, September 21, 2011, : 10 MP
Nikon 1 V1, September 21, 2011, : 10 MP
Nikon 1 J2, August 10, 2012, : 10 MP
Nikon 1 V2, October 24, 2012, : 14 MP
Nikon 1 J3, January 8, 2013, : 14 MP
Nikon 1 S1, January 8, 2013, : 10 MP
Nikon 1 AW1, : 14 MP
Nikon 1 V3, : 18 MP, tilt LCD
Nikon 1 J4, : 18 MP
Nikon 1 J5, : 20 MP

Digital single lens reflex cameras

High-end (Professional – Intended for professional use, heavy duty and weather resistance)
Nikon D1, DX sensor, June 15, 1999 – Discontinued
Nikon D1X, DX sensor, February 5, 2001 – Discontinued
Nikon D1H, DX sensor, high speed, February 5, 2001 – Discontinued
Nikon D2H, DX sensor, high speed, July 22, 2003 – Discontinued
Nikon D2X, DX sensor, September 16, 2004 – Discontinued
Nikon D2HS, DX sensor, high speed, February 16, 2005 – Discontinued
Nikon D2XS, DX sensor, June 1, 2006 – Discontinued
Nikon D3, FX/Full Frame sensor, August 23, 2007 – Discontinued
Nikon D3X, FX/Full Frame sensor, December 1, 2008 – Discontinued
Nikon D3S, FX/Full Frame sensor, October 14, 2009 – Discontinued
Nikon D4, FX/Full Frame sensor, January 6, 2012 – Discontinued
Nikon D4S, FX/Full Frame sensor, February 25, 2014 – Discontinued (In U.S.A. only)
Nikon D5, FX/Full Frame sensor, January 5, 2016
Nikon D6, FX/Full Frame sensor, February 12, 2020

High-end (Prosumer – Intended for pro-consumers who want the main mechanical/weather resistance and electronic features of the professional line but don't need the same heavy duty)
Nikon D100, DX sensor, February 21, 2002 – Discontinued
Nikon D200, DX sensor, November 1, 2005 – Discontinued
Nikon D300, DX sensor, August 23, 2007 – Discontinued
Nikon D300S, DX sensor, July 30, 2009 – Discontinued
Nikon D700, FX/Full Frame sensor, July 1, 2008 – Discontinued
Nikon D800, FX/Full Frame sensor, February 7, 2012 – Discontinued
Nikon D800E, FX/Full Frame sensor, April 2012 – Discontinued
Nikon D600, FX/Full Frame sensor, September 13, 2012 – Discontinued
Nikon D610, FX/Full Frame sensor, October 2013
Nikon Df, FX/Full Frame sensor, November 2013
Nikon D810, FX/Full Frame sensor, June 2014
Nikon D750, FX/Full Frame sensor, September 11, 2014
Nikon D810, FX/Full Frame Sensor, February 2015
Nikon D500, DX sensor, January 5, 2016
Nikon D850, FX/Full Frame sensor, announced July 25, 2017
Nikon D780, FX/Full Frame sensor, January 7, 2020

Midrange and professional usage cameras with DX sensor
Nikon D70, January 28, 2004 – Discontinued
Nikon D70S, April 20, 2005 – Discontinued
Nikon D80, August 9, 2006 – Discontinued
Nikon D90, August 27, 2008 – Discontinued
Nikon D7000, September 15, 2010 – Discontinued
Nikon D7100, February 21, 2013 – Discontinued ( In U.S.A. only )
Nikon D7200, March 2, 2015
Nikon D7500, April 12, 2017

Upper-entry-level (Consumer) – DX sensor

Along with the D750 and D500 above, these are the only Nikon DSLR's with the articulated (tilt-and-swivel) display.
Nikon D5000, April 14, 2009 – Discontinued
Nikon D5100, April 5, 2011 – Discontinued
Nikon D5200, November 6, 2012 Discontinued
Nikon D5300, October 17, 2013
Nikon D5500, January 5, 2015 – Discontinued
Nikon D5600, November 10, 2016
Entry-level (Consumer) – DX sensor
Nikon D50, April 20, 2005 – Discontinued
Nikon D40, November 16, 2006 – Discontinued
Nikon D40X, March 6, 2007 – Discontinued
Nikon D60, January 29, 2008 – Discontinued
Nikon D3000, July 30, 2009 – Discontinued
Nikon D3100, August 19, 2010 – Discontinued
Nikon D3200, April 19, 2012 – Discontinued
Nikon D3300, January 7, 2014 – Discontinued (In U.S.A. only)
Nikon D3400, August 17, 2016 – Discontinued
Nikon D3500, August 3, 2018

Photo optics

Lenses for Nikon Z-mount

Nikon introduced the Z-mount in 2018 for their system of digital full-frame and APS-C (DX) mirrorless cameras.

Lenses for F-mount cameras
The Nikon F-mount is a type of interchangeable lens mount developed by Nikon for its 35 mm Single-lens reflex cameras. The F-mount was first introduced on the Nikon F camera in 1959.
See Nikon F-mount → Nikkor
Lenses with integrated motors: List of Nikon F-mount lenses with integrated autofocus motors

Other lenses for photography and imaging

Electronic flash units

Nikon uses the term Speedlight for its electronic flashes. Recent models include the SB-R200, SB-300, SB-400, SB-600, SB-700, SB-800, SB-900, SB-910, SB-5000 and R1C1.

Film scanners

Nikon's digital capture line also includes a successful range of dedicated scanners for a variety of formats, including Advanced Photo System (IX240), 35 mm, and 60 mm film.
 (1988) LS-3500 (4096x6144, 4000 dpi, 30 bits per pixel) HP-IB (requires a third-party NuBus card; intended for Mac platforms, for which there is a Photoshop plug-in).
 (1992) Coolscan LS-10 (2700 dpi) SCSI. First to be named "Coolscan" to denote LED illumination.
 (1994) LS-3510AF (4096x6144, 4000 dpi, 30 bits per pixel) Auto-focus SCSI (usually employed on Mac platforms with a Photoshop plug-in; TWAIN is available for PC platforms).
 (1995) LS-4500AF (4 x 5 inch and 120/220 formats, 1000x2000 dpi, 35mm format 3000x3000). 12bit A/D. SCSI. Fitted with auto-focus lens.
 (1996) Super Coolscan LS-1000 (2592x3888, 2700 dpi) SCSI. scan time cut by half
 (1996) Coolscan II LS-20 E (2700 dpi) SCSI
 (1998) Coolscan LS-2000 (2700 dpi, 12-bit) SCSI, multiple sample, "CleanImage" software
 (1998) Coolscan III LS-30 E (2700 dpi, 10-bit) SCSI
 (2001) Coolscan IV LS-40 ED (2900 dpi, 12-bit, 3.6D) USB, SilverFast, ICE, ROC, GEM
 (2001) Coolscan LS-4000 ED (4000 dpi, 14-bit, 4.2D) Firewire
 (2001) Coolscan LS-8000 ED (4000 dpi, 14-bit, 4.2D) Firewire, multiformat
 (2003) Coolscan V LS-50 ED (4000 dpi, 14-bit, 4.2D) USB
 (2003) Super Coolscan LS-5000 ED (4000 dpi, 16bit, 4.8D) USB
 (2004) Super Coolscan LS-9000 ED (4000 dpi, 16bit, 4.8D) Firewire, multiformat

Nikon introduced its first scanner, the Nikon LS-3500 with a maximum resolution of 4096 x 6144 pixels, in 1988. Prior to the development of 'cool' LED lighting this scanner used a halogen lamp (hence the name 'Coolscan' for the following models). The resolution of the following LED based Coolscan model didn't increase but the price was significantly lower. Colour depth, scan quality, imaging and hardware functionality as well as scanning speed was gradually improved with each following model. The final 'top of the line' 35mm Coolscan LS-5000 ED was a device capable of archiving greater numbers of slides; 50 framed slides or 40 images on film roll. It could scan all these in one batch using special adapters. A single maximum resolution scan was performed in no more than 20 seconds as long as no post-processing was also performed. With the launch of the Coolscan 9000 ED Nikon introduced its most up-to-date film scanner which, like the Minolta Dimage scanners were the only film scanners that, due to a special version of Digital ICE, were able to scan Kodachrome film reliably both dust and scratch free. In late 2007 much of the software's code had to be rewritten to make it Mac OS 10.5 compatible. Nikon announced it would discontinue supporting its Nikon Scan software for the Macintosh as well as for Windows Vista 64-bit. Third-party software solutions like SilverFast or Vuescan provide alternatives to the official Nikon drivers and scanning software, and maintain updated drivers for most current operating systems. Between 1994 and 1996 Nikon developed three flatbed scanner models named Scantouch, which couldn't keep up with competitive flatbed products and were hence discontinued to allow Nikon to focus on its dedicated film scanners.

Sport optics

Binoculars

 Sprint IV
 Sportstar IV
 Travelite V
 Travelite VI
 Travelite EX
 Mikron
 Action VII
 Action VII Zoom
 Aculon
 Action EX
 Sporter I
 Venturer 8/10x32
 Venturer 8x42
 Prostaff 5
 Prostaff 7
 Monarch ATB
 Monarch 3
 Monarch 5
 Monarch 7
 Monarch HG
 Monarch M5
 Monarch M7
 StabilEyes
 Superior E
 Marine
 EDG II

Spotting scopes

 Prostaff 3 16-48x60
 Prostaff 5 60
 Prostaff 5 80
 Spotter XL II WP
 Spotting Scope R/A II
 Spotting Scope 80
 Fieldscope 60mm
 Fieldscope ED78/ EDII
 Fieldscope III/EDIII
 Fieldscope ED82
 Fieldscope ED50
 Fieldscopes EDG 65 /85
 Fieldscope EDG 85 VR

Rifle scopes

 BLACK
 Monarch 7
 Monarch 5
 Monarch 3
 Monarch
 Laser IRT
 Prostaff 5
 Encore
 Coyote Special
 Slughunter
 Inline
 Buckmaster II
 Buckmaster
 AR
 ProStaff II
 Prostaff
 Team REALTREE
 Rimfire
 Handgun

Nikon Metrology

Overview
Nikon Metrology, a division of Nikon, produces hardware and software products for 2D & 3D measurement from nano to large scale measurement volumes.  Products include Optical Laser Probes, X-ray computed tomography, Coordinate-measuring machine (CMM),Laser Radar Systems (LR), Microscopes, Portable CMMs, Large Volume Metrology, Motion Measurement and Adaptive Robotic Controls, Semiconductor Systems, Metrology Software including CMM-Manager, CAMIO Studio, Inspect-X, Focus, and Automeasure.  Measurements are performed using tactile and non-contact probes, measurement data is collected in software and processed for comparison to nominal CAD (Computer-aided design) or part specification or for recreating / reverse engineering physical work pieces.

Origins
The origins of Nikon go back to 1917 when three Japanese optical manufacturers joined to form Nippon Kogaku KK ('Japan Optics').  In 1925 the microscope having revolving nosepiece and interchangeable objectives was produced.  Significant growth for the microscopy division occurs over the next 50 years as Nikon pioneers development of polarising and stereo microscopes along with new products for measuring and inspection (Metrology) markets.  These new products include devices targeted for industrial use such as optical comparators, autocollimators, profile projector and automated vision based systems.  Continued effort through the next three decades yield the release of products including the Optiphot and Labophot microscopes, Diaphot microscope, the Eclipse range of infinity optics, and finally the DS camera series and the Coolscope with the advent of digital sensors.  With the acquisition of Metris in 2009 the Nikon Metrology division was born.  Nikon Metrology products include a full range of both 2D & 3D, optical, tactile, non-contact, and X-Ray Metrology solutions ranging from nanometer resolution on microscopic samples to μm resolution in volumes large enough to house a commercial airliner.

Products
 Coordinate-Measuring-Machines
 Bridge, Gantry and Horizontal Arm CMMs
 Digital / Analog Tactile and / or Non-Contact Optical sensors
 Portable arms – 6 and 7 axis models
 Laser Scanning – Optical Line Scanners in single Line and Multi-line (Cross Scanner) configurations
 X-ray-and-CT-Inspection
 Video-Microscope-Measuring – Optical Probe and Multi-Sensor options available
 Microscope-Systems
 Large Volume Systems
 Application Software – several options available depending on specific application and hardware.
 CMM-Manager – Multi-sensor 3D Metrology software for third party CMMs, Articulated Arms, and Nikon video-measurement systems
 Automeasure, NIS Elements, E-Max, Automeasure Eyes – 2D / 3D imaging software for use on Nikon video-measurement systems
 Focus, CMM-Manager, CAMIO – Software for 3D Metrology

Lithography equipment

Overview
Nikon manufactures scanners and steppers for the manufacture of integrated circuits and flat panel displays, and semiconductor device inspection equipment. The steppers and scanners represent about one third of the income for the company as of 2008. 

Nikon developed the first lithography equipment from Japan. The equipment from Nikon enjoyed high demand from global chipmakers, the Japanese semiconductor companies and other major companies such as Intel, and Nikon was the world's leading producer of semiconductor lithography systems from the 1980s to 2002. Nikon saw a sharp drop in its market share from less than 40 percent in early 2000s to no more than 20 percent as of 2013. The company has been losing an estimated 17 billion a year in its precision instruments unit.

In contrast, ASML, a Dutch company, has grabbed over 80 percent of the lithography systems market as of 2015 by adopting an open innovation method of product development, which includes the acquisition of U.S-based light source manufacturer Cymer. In 2017, Nikon announced that it would cut nearly 1,000 jobs mainly in the lithography systems business and halt its development of next-generation equipment.

Legal disputes
In February 2019, Nikon, ASML and Carl Zeiss AG, a leading supplier to ASML, have entered into a definitive settlement and cross-license agreement relating to multiple disputes over patents for lithography equipment that had been underway since 2001 and agreed to drop all the world-wide lawsuits regarding the issue.

By the latest settlement, ASML and Zeiss paid approximately $170 million to Nikon. The two companies had paid a total of $87 million to Nikon in 2004 for similar legal dispute.

Market position and products 
As of February 2018, Nikon held 10.3 percent revenue share in the semiconductor lithography market while the share of ASML was over 80 percent.

As of 2019, Nikon develops and sells the following lithography-related equipment:

Cutting-edge flat panel display lithography equipment (The FX series)
i-line steppers
KrF steppers
ArF steppers
ArF immersion steppers
Inspection and alignment equipment

Other products
Nikon also manufactures eyeglasses, sunglasses, and glasses frames, under the brands Nikon, Niji, Nobili-Ti, Presio, and Velociti VTI. Other Nikon's products include ophthalmic equipment, loupes, monoculars, binocular telescopes, metal 3D printers, material processing equipment, regenerative medicine contract manufacturing, cell sorting equipment, and cell culture observation systems.

Nikon no longer manufactures its own image sensors as it outsources the manufacturing to Sony.

Since 2019, Sendai Nikon, a Nikon group company, manufactures Lidar sensors for Velodyne as part of a partnership between the two companies.

Sponsorship

Awards and exhibitions

In Japan, Nikon runs the Nikon Salon exhibition spaces, the Nikkor Club for amateur photographers (to whom it distributes the series of Nikon Salon books), the Nikon Small World Photomicrography Competition and the Nikon Small World in Motion Competition, and arranges the Ina Nobuo Award, Miki Jun Award and Miki Jun Inspiration Awards.

Others
As of November 19, 2013, Nikon is the "Official Camera" of Walt Disney World Resort and Disneyland Resort.

Nikon is the official co-sponsor of Galatasaray SK Football Team.

In 2014 Nikon sponsored the Copa Sadia do Brasil 2014 and the AFC Champions League.

The company sponsors the Nikon-Walkley Press Photographer of the Year award, as well as the Nikon Photography Prizes, which are administered by the Walkley Foundation in Australia.

Cultural references
 Singer Paul Simon referenced Nikon Cameras in his 1973 song "Kodachrome."
 Dexter Morgan, main character of the Showtime series Dexter, can be seen using a Nikon camera throughout the show.
 In the movie Hackers, the character "Lord Nikon" got his alias because of his photographic memory.
 In the lyrics to the Oak Ridge Boys song "American Made", a reference to Nikon Cameras is made ( "I got a Nikon camera, a Sony color TV").
 In the movie The French Connection, the drug dealer gives his girlfriend a Nikon F camera.
 In the film "The Most Beautiful" by Akira Kurosawa, the "East Asian Optical Company" scenes were filmed at the Nippon Kogaku factory in Totsuka, Yokohama, Japan.
 In the TV show Veronica Mars, Veronica, the main character, uses a Nikon Coolpix 8800 throughout season one, and a Nikon DSLR in all other seasons.

Awards and recognition
Nikon was ranked 134th among India's most trusted brands according to the Brand Trust Report 2012, a study conducted by Trust Research Advisory. In the Brand Trust Report 2013, Nikon was ranked 28th among India's most trusted brands and subsequently, according to the Brand Trust Report 2014, Nikon was ranked 178th among India's most trusted brands.

Nikon school
Nikon branches around the world runs photography courses behind the brand Nikon School. The official website of Nikon School offers online photography course since 2016.

See also

Digital single-lens reflex camera
Full-frame digital SLR
History of the single-lens reflex camera
Lenses for SLR and DSLR cameras
Nikon Instruments
Nikkor
Nikon F
Nikon Coolpix series
Nikon Museum
Nikon F-mount
Nikon S-mount
Perspective control lens
Single-lens reflex camera
Canon Inc

Notes and references

External links

 
Optics manufacturing companies
Photography companies of Japan
Defense companies of Japan
Electronics companies of Japan
Equipment semiconductor companies
Electronics companies established in 1917
Technology companies established in 1917
Japanese brands
Lens manufacturers
Mitsubishi companies
Multinational companies headquartered in Japan
Companies listed on the Tokyo Stock Exchange
Japanese companies established in 1917
1940s initial public offerings